The men's hammer throw event at the 1989 Summer Universiade was held at the Wedaustadion in Duisburg on 25 August 1989.

Results

References

Athletics at the 1989 Summer Universiade
1989